Mohammed Ibrahim Mohammed Al-Breik (born 15 September 1992) is a Saudi Arabian professional footballer who plays as a right back for Al-Hilal of Saudi Professional League.

Club career
Mohammed Al-Breik was at Al-Hilal youth academy between 2009 until 2014, in 2014 he was promoted to the first team in 2015 he left on loan.

Al-Raed
In 29 January 2015, Al-Breik was loaned to Al-Raed. He helped Al-Raed to survive the League, helping them to 18 points and go out of the relegation zone.

Al-Hilal
In 20 October 2015, Al-Breik scored his first goal against Al-Ta'awon. After that Al-Breik won the Crown Prince Cup. In the Super Cup 2016 Al-Breik scored his second goal against, but Al-Hilal lost on penalties. He became a regular with Al-Hilal manager Ramón Díaz. In the 2016–17 season, he won his first league and King Cup titles.

International career
On 4 November 2015, he was selected for the Saudi national team for 2018 FIFA World Cup qualification.

In June 2018, he was named in Saudi Arabia's squad for the 2018 FIFA World Cup in Russia. In November 2022, he received a call-up for the 2022 FIFA World Cup in Qatar.

Career statistics

Club

International
Statistics accurate as of match played 26 November 2022.

International goals
Scores and results list Saudi Arabia's goal tally first.

Honours
Al-Hilal
Saudi Professional League: 2016–17, 2017–18, 2019–20, 2020–21, 2021–22
King Cup: 2017, 2019–20
Crown Prince Cup: 2015–16
Saudi Super Cup: 2015, 2018, 2021
AFC Champions League: 2019, 2021

Individual
IFFHS AFC Man Team of the Year: 2020
IFFHS AFC Men's Team of the Decade 2011–2020

References

External links

Mohammed Al-Breik profile at Saudi League

1992 births
Living people
Sportspeople from Riyadh
Saudi Arabian footballers
Association football fullbacks
Al Hilal SFC players
Al-Raed FC players
Saudi Arabia international footballers
Saudi Professional League players
2019 AFC Asian Cup players
2018 FIFA World Cup players
2022 FIFA World Cup players